Wollongong Entertainment Centre (also known by its naming rights sponsor WIN Entertainment Centre and colloquially as the WEC) is a multi-purpose indoor arena, located in Wollongong, New South Wales, Australia.

The WEC opened on 5 September 1998 with a concert by Bob Dylan and Patti Smith; 4,935 people attended the event. Dylan performed at the venue again in 2011, performing to a crowd of 3,214 people, and again in 2018.

The arena is 3 minutes walk from the city centre and has hosted a variety of events including Federation Cup tennis, world championship boxing and international musical acts.

Every year the WIN Entertainment Centre holds the Wakakirri Story Dance Wollongong heat, Southern Stars and also a variety of concerts and expos.

The building was designed by the New South Wales Government Architect.

Sporting events

The venue is the home of the Illawarra Hawks who play in the Australasian-based National Basketball League (NBL). During Hawks games it is referred to as "The Sandpit" in reference to being next to the beach. It is also a play on name of the Hawks former home, the Beaton Park Stadium, which was commonly known as "The Snakepit". The Hawks are the only original club left in the NBL.

The record attendance for an event at the WIN Centre is 5,839, set on 18 February 2005, when the Hawks played their regular season finale against the Sydney Kings.

Naming rights
The naming rights to both facilities are owned by WIN Corporation, a Wollongong-based media company which owns the television network, WIN.

See also
 List of indoor arenas in Australia

References

External links
WEC Official Website
Austadiums.com - WIN Entertainment Centre

National Basketball League (Australia) venues
Basketball venues in Australia
Music venues in Australia
Indoor arenas in Australia
Sport in Wollongong
Illawarra Hawks
Sports venues in New South Wales
Buildings and structures in Wollongong
Sports venues completed in 1998
Netball venues in New South Wales